The Lying Game is a 2011–2013 American teen drama television series.

The Lying Game may also refer to:

Books
 The Lying Game (book series), by Sara Shepard
 The Lying Game, a 2017 novel by Ruth Ware

Television
 The Lying Game (Taiwanese TV series), 2014
 "The Lying Game" (That's So Raven), a season 2 episode of That's So Raven
 "The Lying Game" (The Lone Gunmen), episode 11  of The Lone Gunmen
 "The Lying Game" (CSI: NY), a season 3 episode of CSI: NY